Monstercat 5 Year Anniversary is a compilation album by the Independent record label Monstercat, released on 15 July 2016 and features ten songs from various artists. The album was announced to celebrate the 5th anniversary of Monstercat, which was founded on 1 July 2011.

Background

Monstercat 5 Year Anniversary was released on 15 July 2016, two weeks after Monstercat's 5th anniversary of the label being founded in 2011. On 18 July 2016, Monstercat released Didrick's 5 Year Anniversary Mix, a compilation song featuring several popular songs released by Monstercat including The Girl by Hellberg, Alone by Marshmello and Stronger by Stonebank.

Monstercat 5 Year Anniversary features 10 songs from various artists including Blackout by Pegboard Nerds, Crescendo by Muzzy (featuring vocals by Mylk), Break The Silence by Richard Caddock, Wrld, Nitro Fun, Slips & Slurs and Subtact and Matches by Stephen Walking and Ephixa (featuring vocals by Aaron Richards). Monstercat 5 Year Anniversary features several recurring artists from previous Monstercat compilation albums including Stonebank, Tristam, and Noisestorm.

Track listing

Charts

References

2016 compilation albums
Future bass albums
House music compilation albums
Electro house albums
Monstercat compilation albums